Kınık is a village in the Bilecik District, Bilecik Province, Turkey. Its population is 94 (2021).

References

Villages in Bilecik District